Po Toi O is a small fishing village at Clear Water Bay Peninsula, Sai Kung, New Territories, Hong Kong.

The village is situated at a bay shaped like a sack, thus earning its name Po Toi (meaning a "sack").

Administration
Po Toi O is a recognized village under the New Territories Small House Policy.

History
Po Toi O was historically a multi-clan village with surnames Cheung, Chan, Chong and others.

Features
This small fishing village has two seafood restaurants and is popular with tourists.

There is a Hung Shing Temple in Po Toi O. The temple was probably built in 1663. A Kung So building adjacent to the temple was built in 1740 and was used to deal with village affairs and served as a school until the 1930s. The temple is a Grade III historic building.

In popular culture
 Parts of the Hollywood movie Lara Croft: Tomb Raider – The Cradle of Life were filmed here. 
 Australian celebrity chef Kylie Kwong visited Po Toi O for an episode of the TV series Kylie Kwong: Simply Magic. The episode was called "Hong Kong Island Hideaway".
 In the 2018 ITV TV miniseries Strangers, an apartment owned by a murder victim in Po Toi O proves important to the plot.

Transportation
Po Toi O can be reached by land using Po Toi O Chuen Road. The village is served by green minibus 16 - Po Lam, Tseung Kwan O to Po Toi O.

References

External links

 Delineation of area of existing village Po Toi O (Hang Hau) for election of resident representative (2019 to 2022)
 Pictures of Po Toi O

Villages in Sai Kung District, Hong Kong
Clear Water Bay Peninsula
Bays of Hong Kong
Fishing communities